The Alpinist Unit , Yehidat Ha'Alpinistim) is a special mountain infantry reserve unit of the Israel Defence Forces, under the command of the Israeli Northern Command, focusing on clandestine operations, cold-weather and mountain warfare, commando style raids, crowd control and security check that migrate across the border, gather military intelligence in the area, internal security, irregular warfare operation, medical evacuation for battlefield injuries or emergencies, reconnaissance and tracking targets on the snowy mountains, ski warfare, and difficult terrain warfare in the northern front, especially Mt. Hermon.

The Alpinists are proficient in many aspects of cold-weather and mountain warfare, among them shooting and attacking while sliding on skis and custom-made Snowcats, and defensive tactics. The unit was established in 1983.

Their standard equipment includes M4 carbine assault rifles, the new Israeli TAR-21 Tavor assault rifle, "Negev" light machine gun and sniper rifles, mostly M24 and SR-25.

External links
The Alpinists, Exhibition in the IDF&defense establishment archives

References

Military units and formations of Israel
Northern Command (Israel)
Mountain units and formations
Special forces of Israel